Henry de La Poer Beresford, 6th Marquess of Waterford KP (28 April 1875 – 1 December 1911), was an Irish peer, styled Earl of Tyrone until 1895.

Biography
Lord Tyrone was educated at Eton and became Marquess of Waterford in 1895 on the death of his father by suicide. When Lord Waterford came of age in 1896 seven hundred invited guests, including the Duke of Beaufort attended the celebrations at the family seat of Curraghmore.

He held a commission in the 4th (Militia) battalion of the Worcestershire Regiment until 18 March 1896, when he transferred to a commission with the regular army as he became second lieutenant in the Royal Horse Guards.

He was appointed a deputy lieutenant of Northumberland on 21 May 1901, and invested as a Knight of the Order of St Patrick on 15 March 1902.

On 10 February 1902 he was appointed lieutenant-colonel in command of the South of Ireland Imperial Yeomanry. The following month he was seconded to the 37th Battalion of the Imperial Yeomanry, with the temporary rank of captain in the Army. The battalion had been raised to provide soldiers for the Second Boer War, and left in late May 1902 for South Africa, arriving in Cape Town the following month. Peace had been announced while they were at sea, however, and Lord Waterford soon returned home, resigning his commission in the Imperial Yeomanry on 25 August 1902.

While big game hunting in southern Africa Lord Tyrone was attacked by a lion. He narrowly escaped injury but in 1911 accidentally drowned in a river on his estate at Curraghmore.

Family
On 16 October 1897, he married Beatrix Frances Petty-FitzMaurice. They had six children:
 Lady Blanche Maud Beresford (1898–1940), who married Richard Girouard and had children
 Lady Katharine Nora Beresford (1899–1991), who married her cousin Sir David Dawnay and had children
 John Charles de La Poer Beresford, 7th Marquess of Waterford (1901–1934)
 Lady Beatrix Patricia Beresford (1902–), who married Lynden Miller and had children
 Lord William Beresford (1905–1973), who married Rachel Page and had children
 Lord Hugh Beresford (1908–1941), who died unmarried while serving in the Royal Navy.

After Lord Waterford's death, Beatrix remarried and became Lady Osborne Beauclerk, but was better known as Beatrix Beauclerk. She became the Duchess of St. Albans when her husband, Lord Osborne Beauclerk, succeeded to the ducal title in 1934.

References

1875 births
1911 deaths
People educated at Eton College
Deputy Lieutenants of Northumberland
Knights of St Patrick
Henry
6
South Irish Horse officers